Orkhan Aslanov (born 24 March 1995) is an Azerbaijani Paralympic athlete who specializes in long jump. He represented Azerbaijan at the 2020 Summer Paralympics.

References

1995 births
Living people
Paralympic athletes of Azerbaijan
Athletes (track and field) at the 2020 Summer Paralympics
Medalists at the 2020 Summer Paralympics
Paralympic gold medalists for Azerbaijan
Paralympic medalists in athletics (track and field)
Azerbaijani male long jumpers
21st-century Azerbaijani people